"The First Big Weekend" is a song by Scottish indie rock band Arab Strap. It was first released as a 7" single limited to 700 copies, then later on Arab Strap's debut album, The Week Never Starts Round Here, both released in 1996 on Chemikal Underground.

The song received a large amount of airplay on BBC Radio One's Evening Session show. The show's host, DJ Steve Lamacq, has described the song as the 'best of the decade and also 'the most perfect pop song ever'. The song was used in a commercial for the drink Guinness.

The First Big Weekend is, for the most part, a monologue spoken by Aidan Moffat while bandmate Malcolm Middleton plays guitar and a drum machine accompanies. The lyrics revolve around the events of a weekend in Glasgow and Falkirk, including going out to clubs and bars, watching international football and The Simpsons and trying to pick up girls. Towards the end of the song Malcolm begins to sing the lines "Went out for the weekend, it lasted forever/got high with our friends, it's officially summer"; these are the only sung words in the song.

Fans have worked out that the "First Big Weekend" referred to in the song's title must have started on Thursday 13 June 1996 and the game where "England had won 2-0" refers to the England v Scotland match at Euro '96. 

A rework of the song was released in 2016 to celebrate its 20th anniversary. The rework was produced by Miaoux Miaoux.

Track listing 
Songs and lyrics by Aidan Moffat and Malcolm Middleton.
 7" (CHEM009)
"The First Big Weekend" – 4:52
"Gilded" – 2:40

Personnel 
 Aidan Moffat – vocals, drums
 Malcolm Middleton – guitar
 Paul Savage – producer

Notes

External links 
"The First Big Weekend" on Last.fm

1996 singles
1996 songs